Benjamin Davies (5 June 1873 – 23 June 1930) was a Welsh international rugby halfback who played rugby union for Llanelli and was capped twice for Wales. Davies captained Llanelli for the 1894-95 season and was club secretary between 1898 and 1899. He later became the coach of Llandovery College and also wrote sports articles for the Daily Mail.

Rugby career
Davies played club rugby for first class Welsh team, Llanelli, and it was while representing the 'Scarlets' that he was first selected to play for Wales. Wales had used the Newport half-back pairing of Percy Phillips and Fred Parfitt, but after the retirement of Phillips, the selectors began experimenting with new pairings. The opening game of the 1895 Home Nations Championship against England saw the introduction of two new caps into the half-back positions, Davies and Cardiff's Selwyn Biggs. Despite experienced and talented backs, including Billy Bancroft, Tom Pearson and captain Arthur Gould, the weak forward play from Wales left the backs hamstrung, and the team lost 6-14. The next game of the Championship saw the selectors retain Biggs, but Davies was replaced by a returning Fred Parfitt.

Despite playing no further part in the 1895 tournament, Davies was given another international cap the next year, again in the opening game of the tournament against England. This time Davies' half-back partner was Llanelli team mate David Morgan. The Welsh selectors often favoured less able half-back pairing which came from the same club team, giving a level of continuity to the back play. Morgan was first capped in the last game of the 1895 tournament, a home win over Ireland. Morgan was retained, while his partner Ralph Sweet-Escott was dropped to allow Davies another chance. Played away at Rectory Field in Blackheath, Wales were completely outclassed, losing 25-0. Neither Morgan or Davies were ever selected for Wales again.

International matches played
Wales
  1895, 1896

Bibliography

References

1873 births
1930 deaths
Welsh rugby union players
Rugby union scrum-halves
Rugby union players from Llanelli
Llanelli RFC players
Wales international rugby union players
British sportswriters